The frilled toadfish (Ambophthalmos magnicirrus, previously classified as Neophrynichthys magnicirrus) is a fathead sculpin of the family Psychrolutidae, found on the continental shelf around Australia's Macquarie Island.

References

 Tony Ayling & Geoffrey Cox, Collins Guide to the Sea Fishes of New Zealand,  (William Collins Publishers Ltd, Auckland, New Zealand 1982) 

frilled toadfish
frilled toadfish
Macquarie Island
Marine fish of Southern Australia